Raul Ovidiu Șteau (born 22 April 2001) is a Romanian professional footballer who plays as a defensive midfielder for Liga I club UTA Arad.

Club career

Gaz Metan Mediaș

He made his Liga I debut for Gaz Metan Mediaș against Voluntari on 12 September 2021.

References

External links
 
 

2001 births
Living people
People from Aiud
Romanian footballers
Romania youth international footballers
Association football midfielders
Liga I players
Serie C players
S.S. Monopoli 1966 players
CS Gaz Metan Mediaș players
FC UTA Arad players